David Jeremy Menne (born July 29, 1974) is an American mixed martial artist. He was the first ever UFC Middleweight Champion and has also competed for Cage Rage, Bellator, Shooto, ADCC and RINGS.

Background
Menne was born in Minneapolis, Minnesota and grew up in Forest Lake, Minnesota, attending Forest Lake Area High School where he excelled in Wrestling. Menne continued Wrestling at the collegiate level at the University of Iowa while studying philosophy. He found Muay Thai while in Santa Fe, New Mexico before returning to Minnesota to train at the Minnesota Martial Arts Academy in Shooto.

Mixed martial arts career

Early career
Menne made his professional mixed martial arts debut in 1997 and compiled a record of 23-5-1 with notable wins over Dennis Hallman, Jutaro Nakao, Chris Lytle, and also fought to a draw against Shonie Carter. After Menne lost to Kiyoshi Tamura at the 1999 Rings: King of Kings tournament, he signed with the UFC.

UFC
Menne made his UFC debut at UFC 24 against Fabiano Iha on March 10, 2000 and won via decision. In his next fight, outside of the UFC, he defeated Jose Landi-Jons via majority decision to become the World Extreme Fighting Cruiserweight Superfight Champion. Menne then re-signed with the RINGS organization in Japan.

RINGS
Menne made his RINGS debut against Ryuki Ueyama and fought to a draw. He fought again at an event in Hawaii, a decision loss, before winning his next two fights for the organization against Wataru Sakata and Roberto Traven, respectively. On February 8, 2001 Menne competed in the Shidokan Jitsu - Warriors 1 Tournament and defeated future UFC Welterweight Champion Carlos Newton in the opening round, before later going on to win the tournament. In his last appearance for RINGS, Menne was defeated by Hiromitsu Kanehara via TKO.

Return to UFC
Menne returned to the UFC at UFC 33 to face Gil Castillo for the first UFC Middleweight Championship and won via unanimous decision. In his first title defense at UFC 35, Menne was defeated by Murilo Bustamante via TKO. In his next fight for the UFC, Menne faced Phil Baroni at UFC 39 and was knocked out in only 18 seconds.

After UFC 39, Menne went 9-4 in his next 13 fights before returning to the UFC at UFC Ultimate Fight Night 5 on June 28, 2006 against Josh Koscheck and lost via unanimous decision. Menne then fought at UFC Fight Night 7 on December 13, 2006 against Luigi Fioravanti and lost via TKO.

Bellator
Two years after his last UFC appearance, Menne picked up a win before being signed by Bellator Fighting Championships. He made his debut for the organization at Bellator IV against Norman Paraisy in the quarterfinals of the Bellator Season One Welterweight Tournament on April 17, 2009. Though the underdog coming into the fight, Menne won via third round rear naked choke submission. Less than a month later, Menne faced Omar de la Cruz at Bellator 7 on May 15, 2009. Menne lost via TKO. He left the organization in late 2009.

Post-Bellator
In his first fight since being released from Bellator, Menne fought and defeated Adrian Miles at XKL Evolution 2 on April 24, 2010. He then defeated Eric Davila via guillotine choke at UWF 1 on November 26, 2011. Menne's most recent fight is a rematch with mixed martial arts legend Murilo Bustamante, the man he lost his UFC Championship to. He lost by unanimous decision.

Championships and accomplishments
Ultimate Fighting Championship
UFC Middleweight Championship (One time; first)
HOOKnSHOOT
HOOKnSHOOT Lightweight Tournament Champion 
HOOKnSHOOT Lightweight Championship (One time; first)
World Extreme Fighting
WEF Cruiserweight Superfight Championship
Shidokan Jitsu Warriors War 1
Tournament Winner

Mixed martial arts record

|-
| Loss
| align=center| 45–17–2
| Murilo Bustamante
| Decision (unanimous)
| Amazon Forest Combat 2
| 
| align=center| 3
| align=center| 5:00
| Manaus, Amazonas, Brazil
|Middleweight bout.
|-
| Win
| align=center| 45–16–2
| Eric Davila
| Submission (guillotine choke)
| UWF 1: Huerta vs. War Machine	
| 
| align=center| 1
| align=center| 1:35
| Pharr, Texas, United States
| 
|-
| Win
| align=center| 44–16–2
| Adrian Miles
| Decision (unanimous)
| XKL Evolution 2
| 
| align=center| 3
| align=center| 5:00
| Minneapolis, Minnesota, United States
| 
|-
| Loss
| align=center| 43–16–2
| Omar de la Cruz
| TKO (punches)
| Bellator 7
| 
| align=center| 1
| align=center| 3:19
| Chicago, Illinois, United States
| 
|-
| Win
| align=center| 43–15–2
| Norman Paraisy
| Submission (rear-naked choke)
| Bellator IV
| 
| align=center| 3
| align=center| 2:39
| Norman, Oklahoma, United States
| 
|-
| Win
| align=center| 42–15–2
| Travis McCollough
| TKO (punches)
| Brutaal: Fight Club
| 
| align=center| 1
| align=center| 2:34
| Maplewood, Minnesota, United States
| 
|-
| Loss
| align=center| 41–15–2
| Luigi Fioravanti
| TKO (punches)
| UFC Fight Night: Sanchez vs. Riggs
| 
| align=center| 1
| align=center| 4:44
| San Diego, California, United States
| 
|-
| Loss
| align=center| 41–14–2
| Josh Koscheck
| Decision (unanimous)
| UFC Fight Night 5
| 
| align=center| 3
| align=center| 5:00
| Las Vegas, Nevada, United States
| 
|-
| Win
| align=center| 41–13–2
| Alex Reid
| Decision (unanimous)
| Cage Rage 16
| 
| align=center| 3
| align=center| 5:00
| London, England
|Middleweight bout.
|-
| Loss
| align=center| 40–13–2
| Jake Shields
| Decision (unanimous)
| Rumble on the Rock 8
| 
| align=center| 3
| align=center| 5:00
| Honolulu, Hawaii, United States
| 
|-
| Loss
| align=center| 40–12–2
| Ed Herman
| TKO (corner stoppage)
| EC 63: Extreme Challenge 63
| 
| align=center| 1
| align=center| 5:00
| Hayward, Wisconsin, United States
| 
|-
| Win
| align=center| 40–11–2
| Jerry Spiegel
| Submission (guillotine choke)
| EC 62: Extreme Challenge 62
| 
| align=center| 1
| align=center| 3:17
| Medina, Minnesota, United States
| 
|-
| Win
| align=center| 39–11–2
| Trevor Garrett
| Decision (split)
| EC 60: Extreme Challenge 60
| 
| align=center| 3
| align=center| 5:00
| Medina, Minnesota, United States
| 
|-
| Win
| align=center| 38–11–2
| Eddie Sanchez
| Submission (rear naked choke)
| EC 59: Extreme Challenge 59
| 
| align=center| 1
| align=center| 0:53
| Medina, Minnesota, United States
| 
|-
| Win
| align=center| 37–11–2
| Todd Carney
| Decision (unanimous)
| EC 58: Extreme Challenge 58
| 
| align=center| 3
| align=center| 5:00
| Medina, Minnesota, United States
| 
|-
| Win
| align=center| 36–11–2
| Leo Sylvest
| Submission (toe hold)
| EC 56: Extreme Challenge 56
| 
| align=center| 1
| align=center| 2:06
| Medina, Minnesota, United States
| 
|-
| Loss
| align=center| 35–11–2
| Falaniko Vitale
| Decision (unanimous)
| SB 33: SuperBrawl 33
| 
| align=center| 3
| align=center| 5:00
| Honolulu, Hawaii, United States
| 
|-
| Win
| align=center| 35–10–2
| Sam Cleveland
| TKO (punches)
| EC: Best of the Best 2: Day Event
| 
| align=center| 1
| align=center| N/A
| Anoka, Minnesota, United States
| 
|-
| Loss
| align=center| 34–10–2
| Hayato Sakurai
| TKO (cut)
| DEEP: 10th Impact
| 
| align=center| 2
| align=center| 2:02
| Tokyo, Japan
| 
|-
| Win
| align=center| 34–9–2
| Dennis Reed
| TKO
| EC: Extreme Combat
| 
| align=center| 1
| align=center| N/A
| Ramsey, Minnesota, United States
| 
|-
| Win
| align=center| 33–9–2
| Todd Carney
| Submission (guillotine choke)
| ICC 2: Rebellion
| 
| align=center| 1
| align=center| 1:05
| Minneapolis, Minnesota, United States
| 
|-
| Loss
| align=center| 32–9–2
| Phil Baroni
| KO (strikes)
| UFC 39
| 
| align=center| 1
| align=center| 0:18
| Uncasville, Connecticut, United States
| 
|-
| Win
| align=center| 32–8–2
| Robert Ferguson
| TKO (retirement)
| UAGF 2: Ultimate Cage Fighting 2
| 
| align=center| 2
| align=center| 5:00
| Hollywood, California, United States
| 
|-
| Loss
| align=center| 31–8–2
| Murilo Bustamante
| TKO (punches)
| UFC 35
| 
| align=center| 2
| align=center| 0:44
| Uncasville, Connecticut, United States
| 
|-
| Win
| align=center| 31–7–2
| Gil Castillo
| Decision (unanimous)
| UFC 33
| 
| align=center| 5
| align=center| 5:00
| Las Vegas, Nevada, United States
| 
|-
| Loss
| align=center| 30–7–2
| Hiromitsu Kanehara
| TKO (punches)
| RINGS: King of Kings 2000 Final
| 
| align=center| 3
| align=center| 3:24
| Tokyo, Japan
| 
|-
| Win
| align=center| 30–6–2
| Karimula Barkalaev
| Decision (unanimous)
| Shidokan Jitsu: Warriors War 1
| 
| align=center| 1
| align=center| 10:00
| Kuwait
| 
|-
| Win
| align=center| 29–6–2
| Shamir Maromegob
| Decision (unanimous)
| Shidokan Jitsu: Warriors War 1
| 
| align=center| 1
| align=center| 10:00
| Kuwait
| 
|-
| Win
| align=center| 28–6–2
| Carlos Newton
| Decision (unanimous)
| Shidokan Jitsu: Warriors War 1
| 
| align=center| 1
| align=center| 10:00
| Kuwait
|Return to Middleweight.
|-
| Win
| align=center| 27–6–2
| Roberto Traven
| Decision (unanimous)
| Rings: King of Kings 2000 Block A
| 
| align=center| 3
| align=center| 5:00
| Tokyo, Japan
|Heavyweight bout.
|-
| Win
| align=center| 26–6–2
| Wataru Sakata
| Decision (unanimous)
| RINGS: King of Kings 2000 Block A
| 
| align=center| 2
| align=center| 5:00
| Tokyo, Japan
|Heavyweight bout.
|-
| Loss
| align=center| 25–6–2
| Chris Munsen
| Decision
| RINGS USA: Rising Stars Block B
| 
| align=center| 2
| align=center| 5:00
| Honolulu, Hawaii, United States
| 
|-
| Draw
| align=center| 25–5–2
| Ryuki Ueyama
| Draw
| RINGS: Millennium Combine 2
| 
| align=center| 2
| align=center| 5:00
| Tokyo, Japan
| 
|-
| Win
| align=center| 25–5–1
| Jose Landi-Jons
| Decision (majority)
| WEF 9: World Class
| 
| align=center| 3
| align=center| 5:00
| Evansville, Indiana, United States
| 
|-
| Win
| align=center| 24–5–1
| Fabiano Iha
| Decision (unanimous)
| UFC 24
| 
| align=center| 3
| align=center| 5:00
| Lake Charles, Louisiana, United States
|Welterweight bout.
|-
| Loss
| align=center| 23–5–1
| Kiyoshi Tamura
| Decision (unanimous)
| RINGS: King of Kings 1999 Block B
| 
| align=center| 2
| align=center| 5:00
| Osaka, Japan
|Heavyweight debut.
|-
| Win
| align=center| 23–4–1
| Laverne Clark
| Submission (guillotine choke)
| EC 29: Extreme Challenge 29
| 
| align=center| 2
| align=center| 3:18
| Hayward, Wisconsin, United States
| 
|-
| Win
| align=center| 22–4–1
| Chris Lytle
| Decision (unanimous)
| EC 29: Extreme Challenge 29
| 
| align=center| 2
| align=center| 5:00
| Hayward, Wisconsin, United States
| 
|-
| Win
| align=center| 21–4–1
| Jutaro Nakao
| Decision (unanimous)
| SB 13: SuperBrawl 13
| 
| align=center| 3
| align=center| 5:00
| Honolulu, Hawaii, United States
| 
|-
| Win
| align=center| 20–4–1
| Mark Walker
| Submission (rear naked choke)
| UW: Ultimate Wrestling
| 
| align=center| 1
| align=center| 1:15
| Bloomington, Minnesota, United States
| 
|-
| Win
| align=center| 19–4–1
| Joe Geromiller
| Submission (kneebar)
| SFC: Submission Fighting Championships 7
| 
| align=center| 1
| align=center| 3:10
| Carbondale, Illinois, United States
| 
|-
| Win
| align=center| 18–4–1
| CJ Fernandes
| Submission (armbar)
| Dangerzone: Mahnomen
| 
| align=center| 1
| align=center| 0:58
| Mahnomen, Minnesota, United States
| 
|-
| Win
| align=center| 17–4–1
| Jesse Jones
| Decision (unanimous)
| EC 25: Extreme Challenge 25
| 
| align=center| 1
| align=center| 20:00
| Council Bluffs, Iowa, United States
| 
|-
| Win
| align=center| 16–4–1
| Brent Medley
| TKO (guillotine choke)
| EC 25: Extreme Challenge 25
| 
| align=center| 1
| align=center| 0:21
| Council Bluffs, Iowa, United States
| 
|-
| Win
| align=center| 15–4–1
| Dennis Hallman
| Decision (unanimous)
| Shooto: 10th Anniversary Event
| 
| align=center| 3
| align=center| 5:00
| Yokohama, Japan
| 
|-
| Win
| align=center| 14–4–1
| Jim Czajkowski
| Submission (kneebar)
| SFC: Submission Fighting Championships 6
| 
| align=center| 1
| align=center| 0:00
| O'Fallon, Illinois, United States
| 
|-
| Win
| align=center| 13–4–1
| Mike McClure
| TKO (submission to punches)
| EC 23: Extreme Challenge 23
| 
| align=center| 1
| align=center| 4:47
| Indianapolis, Indiana, United States
| 
|-
| Win
| align=center| 12–4–1
| Ken Parham
| Decision (unanimous)
| EC 23: Extreme Challenge 23
| 
| align=center| 1
| align=center| 15:00
| Indianapolis, Indiana, United States
| 
|-
| Win
| align=center| 11–4–1
| Vernon Yates
| Submission (rear-naked choke)
| Gladiators 2: Gladiators 2
| 
| align=center| 1
| align=center| 0:18
| Sioux City, Iowa, United States
| 
|-
| Win
| align=center| 10–4–1
| Brett Jones
| Submission (rear-naked choke)
| Gladiators 2: Gladiators 2
| 
| align=center| 1
| align=center| 0:14
| Sioux City, Iowa, United States
| 
|-
| Loss
| align=center| 9–4–1
| Matt Hughes
| Decision (unanimous)
| EC 21: Extreme Challenge 21
| 
| align=center| 1
| align=center| 15:00
| Hayward, Wisconsin, United States
| 
|-
| Win
| align=center| 9–3–1
| Adam Johnson
| TKO (guillotine choke)
| EC 21: Extreme Challenge 21
| 
| align=center| 1
| align=center| 0:51
| Hayward, Wisconsin, United States
| 
|-
| Draw
| align=center| 8–3–1
| Shonie Carter
| Draw
| EC 20: Extreme Challenge 20
| 
| align=center| 1
| align=center| 20:00
| Davenport, Iowa, United States
| 
|-
| Win
| align=center| 8–3
| Phil Johns
| Decision
| EC 19: Extreme Challenge 19
| 
| align=center| 1
| align=center| 15:00
| Hayward, Wisconsin, United States
| 
|-
| Win
| align=center| 7–3
| Andy Sanders
| Decision
| EC 19: Extreme Challenge 19
| 
| align=center| 1
| align=center| 15:00
| Hayward, Wisconsin, United States
| 
|-
| Win
| align=center| 6–3
| Henry Matamoros
| Decision
| WVT: Wisconsin Vale Tudo
| 
| align=center| 1
| align=center| 10:00
| Milwaukee, Wisconsin, United States
| 
|-
| Loss
| align=center| 5–3
| Adrian Serrano
| Decision (split)
| WVT: Wisconsin Vale Tudo
| 
| align=center| 1
| align=center| 12:00
| Milwaukee, Wisconsin, United States
| 
|-
| Loss
| align=center| 5–2
| Jesse Jones
| Submission (armbar)
| EC 15: Extreme Challenge 15
| 
| align=center| 1
| align=center| 5:45
| Muncie, Indiana, United States
| 
|-
| Loss
| align=center| 5–1
| Shonie Carter
| Decision
| EC 5: Extreme Challenge 5
| 
| align=center| 1
| align=center| 15:00
| Waterloo, Iowa, United States
| 
|-
| Win
| align=center| 5–0
| Laverne Clark
| Submission (triangle choke)
| EC 5: Extreme Challenge 5
| 
| align=center| 1
| align=center| 5:51
| Waterloo, Iowa, United States
| 
|-
| Win
| align=center| 4–0
| Tim Wills
| Submission (bad position)
| HOOKnSHOOT: Absolute Fighting Championship 1
| 
| align=center| 1
| align=center| 1:06
| Evansville, Indiana, United States
| 
|-
| Win
| align=center| 3–0
| Sean Coultas
| TKO (towel thrown from armbar)
| HOOKnSHOOT: Lightweight Championship
| 
| align=center| 1
| align=center| 3:29
| Evansville, Indiana, United States
| 
|-
| Win
| align=center| 2–0
| Adam Fisher
| Submission (rear-naked choke)
| HOOKnSHOOT: Lightweight Championship
| 
| align=center| 1
| align=center| 3:39
| Evansville, Indiana, United States
| 
|-
| Win
| align=center| 1–0
| Duane Bressinger
| Submission (armbar)
| HOOKnSHOOT: Lightweight Championship
| 
| align=center| 1
| align=center| 2:37
| Evansville, Indiana, United States
|

See also
List of male mixed martial artists
List of UFC champions

References

External links

Official UFC Profile

American male mixed martial artists
Ultimate Fighting Championship male fighters
Ultimate Fighting Championship champions
Mixed martial artists from Minnesota
Welterweight mixed martial artists
Middleweight mixed martial artists
Mixed martial artists utilizing collegiate wrestling
Sportspeople from Minneapolis
1974 births
Living people